

245001–245100 

|-bgcolor=#f2f2f2
| colspan=4 align=center | 
|}

245101–245200 

|-id=158
| 245158 Thomasandrews ||  || Thomas Andrews (1873–1912), the British shipbuilder who was primarily responsible for the design of the RMS Titanic || 
|}

245201–245300 

|-bgcolor=#f2f2f2
| colspan=4 align=center | 
|}

245301–245400 

|-bgcolor=#f2f2f2
| colspan=4 align=center | 
|}

245401–245500 

|-id=417
| 245417 Rostand ||  || Edmond Rostand (1868–1918), a French poet and playwright. || 
|}

245501–245600 

|-bgcolor=#f2f2f2
| colspan=4 align=center | 
|}

245601–245700 

|-bgcolor=#f2f2f2
| colspan=4 align=center | 
|}

245701–245800 

|-bgcolor=#f2f2f2
| colspan=4 align=center | 
|}

245801–245900 

|-id=890
| 245890 Krynychenka ||  || Galyna Ivanivna Biletska (born 1961), the leader of the "Krynychenka" folk song and dance ensemble from Andrushivka || 
|}

245901–246000 

|-id=943
| 245943 Davidjoseph ||  || David Joseph Masiero (1953–2013), an American mechanical engineer, specializing in nuclear power plant design. He is the father of the discoverer Joseph Masiero. || 
|-id=983
| 245983 Machholz ||  || Donald Machholz (1952–2022) is an American amateur astronomer. He discovered visually 11 new comets in 1978–2010 (including periodic comets 96P and 141P). He is one of the inventors of the Messier marathon, a race to observe all the Messier objects in a single night. || 
|}

References 

245001-246000